Greatest Hits and Black Beauties is an album by L.A. Guns. Although the title would indicate that the album featured the group's biggest hits, it is in fact more accurately described as a unique studio album, featuring re-recordings of older L.A. Guns songs in a newer style, along with a handful of new tracks.

Three years later, the band released an album with a similarly misleading title, Ultimate LA Guns, presented as the band's second greatest hits album (following Best Of: Hollywood a Go-Go); however, this release included the same re-recordings featured on Greatest Hits and Black Beauties instead of the original hit versions of the songs.

Track listing
 "Bricks"
 "One More Reason"
 "Ritual"
 "Electric Gypsy"
 "No Mercy"
 "Sex Action"
 "Rip N Tear"
 "Disbelief"
 "Ballad of Jayne"
 "Time"
 "Heartful of Soul"
 "3 Minute Atomic Egg"
 "One More Reason" (Julian Beeston remix)
 "Sex Action" (Intra-Venus remix)

"Heartful of Soul" is a cover of a Yardbirds song.

Line up
Phil Lewis - lead vocals
Tracii Guns - guitar
Mick Cripps - guitar
Kelly Nickels - bass
Steve Riley - drums

References

1999 greatest hits albums
L.A. Guns compilation albums